Habshan is an area in the southwestern part of the Emirate of Abu Dhabi in the United Arab Emirates.

It is currently a major oil and gas field for the Abu Dhabi National Oil Company (ADNOC). It contains oil field and camps for oil workers. The major part of this region is marked as a Red Zone due to the presence of hydrogen sulphide gas.

The area is a major production area for Sulphur, a byproduct of the oil industry, and is the terminal station of a new railway network in the United Arab Emirates developed by Etihad Rail. Commercial operations on this railway commenced in December 2015.

See also 
 Habshan–Fujairah oil pipeline

References 

Oil fields of the United Arab Emirates
Natural gas fields in the United Arab Emirates
Western Region, Abu Dhabi